Howard Neill Austin  (12 December 1924 – 24 June 2008) was a New Zealand politician of the National Party. He held many positions with Federated Farmers.

Early life
Austin was born in 1924 in Rawene, a town on the south side of the Hokianga harbour. His father was William Neill Austin. He received his education at Okaihau District High School (now Okaihau College). In 1946, he married Violet Mudgway, the daughter of Herbert Lewis Mudgway; the couple were to have three daughters.

Outside politics
Austin was a member of the Umawera School committee from 1956 to 1962. He was on the executive of the Umawera Settlers' Association, and chaired the group from 1960 to 1965. He was a member of the Waihou Memorial Church committee from 1968; Waihou is a locality west of Kaitaia. Austin was on the Auckland Provincial Executive of Federated Farmers from 1969 to 1975, and was president of the Bay of Islands branch of the group from 1970 to 1975. From 1971 to 1975, he was a member of the Council of the Dominion Dairy Section of Federated Farmers.

Political career

He represented the Hobson electorate from 1975 to 1978, and then the Bay of Islands electorate from 1978 to 1987, when he retired and was replaced by John Carter.

During his time at Parliament he was known by his nickname "Old Blackberry" for successfully lobbying for public funding for farmers to eradicate the spread of wild blackberry which had become a noxious weed.

Later life
In the 1994 Queen's Birthday Honours, Austin was appointed a Member of the Order of the British Empire, for public services. He died on 24 June 2008.

References 

|-

|-

1924 births
2008 deaths
New Zealand National Party MPs
New Zealand MPs for North Island electorates
New Zealand Members of the Order of the British Empire
Members of the New Zealand House of Representatives
20th-century New Zealand politicians